Morshyn is a small city located at the Eastern Carpathian Foothills within Ukraine's Stryi Raion, Lviv Oblast (region). It hosts the administration of Morshyn urban hromada, one of the hromadas of Ukraine.

Quick overview 

The first mentioning of the settlement is found in a court note of 2 January 1482 which indicated that Morshyn and surrounding villages belonged to a nobleman (szlachtic) Juchno Nagwazdan and was part of the Kingdom of Poland. In 1538 Morshyn owners, the Branecki family, who became interested in local industry which was a salt mining have acquired a permission from the royal chancellery on opening of salt mines. Five mine wells were dug out for brine extraction. However, the business did not justify itself as the Morshyns salt was bitter and unfit for consumption. The salt industries fell into decline.

In the second half of 17th century Morshyn remained a poor village. In 1692 Morshyn accounted for 12 yards (as dwelling units). The settlement was changing hands and often was transferring between owners. Following the first partition of Poland in 1772, Morshyn went to the Austrian Empire.

With construction of railroad Stryj—Stanislawow through Morshyn, a life has revived in the village. Since 1878 Morshyn is known as a spa resort. The first chemical analysis of mineral water was published by a professor of the Lviv University W.Radziszewski in 1881. About therapeutic properties of the Morshyn's brine at that time wrote by many researchers, comparing it with waters of famous then German, Hungarian, and Czech resorts.

In 1918-1939 Morshyn was in Polish territory and, as "Morszyn-Zdrój," was a popular spa. The spa belonged to the Medical Association (Towarzystwo Lekarskie) from Lviv (Lwów), in late 1920s almost 1000 guests came there yearly. During the times when western Ukraine was under Polish authority, the city was part of the Ivano-Frankivsk regional administration, Stanisławów Voivodeship back then. Currently the town is located in the close proximity to Ivano-Frankivsk Oblast and Carpathian Mountains. Currently the city is one of the major national tourist resort as well as health resorts. The city continues to carry on its legacy of one of the best health resorts in Europe.

Until 18 July 2020, Morshyn was incorporated as a city of oblast significance. In July 2020, as part of the administrative reform of Ukraine, which reduced the number of raions of Lviv Oblast to seven, the city of Morshyn was merged into Stryi Raion.

After dissolution of the Soviet Union, in the city appeared couple football clubs among which is FC Skala that place at a local small stadium.

Gallery

See also
 FC Skala Stryi (2004)
 FC Medyk Morshyn

References

External links
 Danylyuk, Yu.Z., Dmytruk, V.I. Morshyn (МОРШИН). Encyclopedia of History of Ukraine.
 Travel agency web-site with offers to travel to Morshyn as one of the places with the best sanatoriums 
 Another web-site that describes Morshyn's great spas 
 Morshyn is a well-known spa town in the Lviv region caring for gastrointestinal issues 
 Web-site of the Lviv Oblast administration that mentions Morshyn is the city that specializes in the development of the sanatorium resort network 
 Travel agency web-site with offers to healthy travel 

Cities in Lviv Oblast
Spa towns in Ukraine
Cities of regional significance in Ukraine